The Sijŏng Line is an electrified standard-gauge freight-only secondary line of the Korean State Railway in South P'yŏngan Province and P'yŏngyang, North Korea, running from Kalli on the P'yŏngŭi Line to Sijŏng.

Route
A yellow background in the "Distance" box indicates that section of the line is not electrified.

References

Railway lines in North Korea
Standard gauge railways in North Korea